Seahill is a village on the northern coast of County Down, Northern Ireland. It is within the townland of Ballyrobert, with Holywood to the west and Helen's Bay and Crawfordsburn to the east. Seahill was once a stand-alone settlement but it is now joined to Holywood and the Greater Belfast conurbation. In the 2011 Census it had a population of 1,018 people.

2011 Census 
Seahill is classified as a village by the NI Statistics and Research Agency (NISRA) (i.e. with population between 1,000 and 2,250 people). On Census day (27 March 2011) there were 1,018 people living in Seahill. Of these:
17.0% were aged under 17 years and 24.6% were aged 65 and over
50.1% of the population were male and 49.9% were female
62.2% identified as Christian, 23.0% as non-religious and 14.1% as Roman Catholic 
1.4% of people aged 16–74 were unemployed

Transport
Seahill railway station was opened on 4 April 1966.

References

See also 
List of towns and villages in Northern Ireland

Villages in County Down
Seaside resorts in Northern Ireland